Garthorpe  may refer to the following places in England:
Garthorpe, Leicestershire
Garthorpe, Lincolnshire